Ayush Tandon (born 31 July 1998) is an actor working in Bollywood and Hollywood films. He played Pi, age 12 in the 2012 Hollywood film Life of Pi. Ayush made his acting debut in the 2011 Bollywood film 7 Khoon Maaf. At the age of 10, he, along with Vasundhara Raturi entered as contestants in the first season of Chota Packet Bada Dhamaka and were declared as the winning jodi (team) during the grand finale which took place on 3 January 2009.

In 2013, Ayush made his music video debut with Labdiyaan, with co-actor Avneet Kaur under the music label Times Music.

Ayush Made his directorial debut with the documentary film (Dis)abled in 2017. Ayush also starred in a short film named She which was produced by Farhan Akhtar’s MARD (Men Against Rape and Discrimination), filmmaker Feroz Abbas Khan and Population Foundation of India (PFI) jointly. The short film was based on sexual harassment faced by women. The film was released online on 25 November 2018.

In April 2019, Ayush made his singing debut with the song 'Guzre Jo Lamhe'. The video for the song was directed by his Father, Hatinder Tandon, who also penned the lyrics.

Personal life
Ayush was born an in Pune to his parents Hatinder Tandon and Asha Tandon. He cleared his Secondary School Certificate (SSC) board exams in the year 2014, scoring 87 percent and is currently a student at Annasaheb Vartak College of Arts, Commerce and Science.

Filmography

Film

Web series

Reality Television

References

External links

Living people
1998 births
Male actors from Mumbai
21st-century Indian male child actors
Male actors in Hindi cinema